The Nordic sexual morality debate (Danish: sædelighedsfejden, Swedish: sedlighetsdebatten, Norwegian: sedelighetsdebatten) was the name for a cultural movement and public debate in Scandinavia in the 1880s, where sexuality and sexual morals were discussed in newspapers, magazines, books and theatrical plays.

The topic was criticism of the contemporary sexual double standards, in which it was socially acceptable for men to have premarital sexual experience, while women were expected to be virgins, and the contemporary view on prostitution, which was sanctioned as a "necessary evil" because of this double standard, an issue that had been raised by Svenska Federationen in 1878.  

The debate was divided in two sides: the moderate one, where Bjørnstjerne Bjørnson was the most known representative, wished to solve this double standard by demanding that men also be virgins on their wedding night, as women were. The radical one, where Edvard Brandes and Georg Brandes were the most known representatives, demanded that women be free to enjoy a sexual life prior to marriage, as men were.

Getting Married by August Strindberg and the legal court case that surrounded it was one of the perhaps most known incidents during the debate. It also caused a debate within the literary world whether literature should touch these questions at all. Other well-known works in the debate are Henrik Ibsen's play A Doll's House (Et Dukkehjem), the novel Money (Pengar) by Viktoria Benedictsson, and the novel Pyrhussegrar by Stella Kleve.

See also
 Modern Breakthrough
 Sexual liberation

References
 Franka Gebert, Den stora nordiska sedlighetsdebatten, Riksteatern, 2008. PDF.
 Nationalencyklopedin: "Sedlighetsdebatten" 

1880s in Denmark
1880s in Norway
1880s in Sweden
Cultural history of Denmark
Cultural history of Norway
Cultural history of Sweden
Debates about social issues
Morality
Scandals in Denmark
Scandals in Norway
Scandals in Sweden
Sexual ethics
Social commentary
Social ethics
Social history of Denmark
Social history of Norway
Social history of Sweden